The 39th New York Infantry Regiment, known as the "Garibaldi Guard" after the Italian revolutionary, Giuseppe Garibaldi, was an infantry regiment that served in the Union Army during the American Civil War.

Service

This regiment was mustered (assembled) in New York City by the Union Defense Committee, under the leadership of Col. Frederick George D'Utassy by special authority from the War Department during the Civil War of the United States.  On May 27, 1861, they deployed to Washington D.C., having been authorized for a period of three years by New York State.

Initially, the regiment was divided into eleven companies of men of different national heritage: three German, three Hungarian, one Swiss, one Italian, one French, one Spanish, and one Portuguese. On May 31, 1863, the regiment was consolidated into four companies: A, B, C and D. The regiment expanded as new companies were recruited in the field.  On December 8, 1863, Company E was added; on December 14, 1863, Company F joined.  On December 19, 1863, Company G was added; and on December 30, 1863 Company H joined.  Companies I and K joined in January, 1864.

Companies A, B, C and D were mustered out in New York city June 24, 1864.  Enlistees who were not entitled to be discharged were transferred to other companies within the regiment.  Six companies: E, F, G, H, I and K, remained in service.  In October, 1864, a new Company D, mustered mostly from Malone, New York joined the regiment for one year.  On June 2, 1865, the members of the regiment not eligible to be mustered out were transferred into the 185th Infantry.

The regiment left the New York State May 28, 1861; served at and near Washington, D. C., from June 1, 1861; in the 1st Brigade, 5th Division, Army of Northeastern Virginia, from July 13, 1861; in Blenker's Brigade, Division of Potomac, from August 4, 1861; in Stahel's Brigade, Blenker's Division, Army of the Potomac, from October 15, 1861; in 1st Brigade, same division, Mountain Department, from April, 1862; in White's Brigade, Army of Virginia, at Winchester, Va., from July, 1862; at Harper's Ferry, W. Va., from September, 1862; at Camp Douglass, Chicago, Ill., from September 27, 1862; near Washington, D.C., 1st Brigade, Casey's Division, defenses of Washington, from December, 1862; in January, 1863, in 3d Brigade, Casey's, later Abercrombie's Division, 22d Corps; in 3d Brigade, 3d Division, 2d Corps, Army of the Potomac, from June 25, 1863; in the 3d, and for a time in the Consolidated, Brigade, 1st Division, 2d Corps, Army of the Potomac, from March, 1864; and was honorably discharged and mustered out, under Col. Augustus Funk, July I, 1865, except (new) Company D, which had been mustered out, June 7, 1865, at Alexandria, Va.
 
During its period of service, 5 officers and 62 enlisted men were killed in action; 3 officers and 49 enlisted men died of wounds received in action; 1 officer and 158 enlisted men died of disease and other causes.  In total, 278 men (9 officers and 269 enlistees) died while in service in the regiment.  Of those, 1 officer and 99 enlisted men died while captured by the Rebel army.

Total strength and casualties
The regiment suffered a total of 274 fatalities.  Eight officers and 107 enlisted men were killed in action or mortally wounded and 1 officer and 158 enlisted men died of disease.

Commanders
Colonel Frederick George D'Utassy
Major Daniel Woodall — July 30, 1863 - October 5, 1863 (detached from the 1st Delaware Infantry Regiment)
Colonel Augustus Funk

Reenactment

See also
List of New York Civil War regiments
Italian Americans in the Civil War
Hispanics in the American Civil War

Notes

References
The Civil War Archive

External links
 Catalfamo, Catherine; The Thorny Rose: The Americanization Of An Urban, Immigrant, Working Class Regiment In The Civil War. A Social History Of The 39th New York Volunteer Infantry; The University of Texas at Austin; 1989; Ph.D. Thesis
 New York State Military Museum and Veterans Research Center - Civil War - 39th Infantry Regiment History, photographs, table of battles and casualties, and historical sketch for the 39th New York Infantry Regiment.
 http://www.civilwarhome.com/italian.htm
 http://www.daddezio.com/italy/garibaldi/index.html

1861 establishments in New York (state)
Military units and formations established in 1861
Infantry 039
Military units and formations disestablished in 1865